Ctenopoma pellegrini is a fish in the  family Anabantidae found in the Congo River basin of Africa.
It grows to 11.2 cm in total length for a male/unsexed specimen. This species was formally described by the British-Belgian ichthyologist George Albert Boulenger in 1902 with the type locality given as Yembe River at Banzyville in the Democratic Republic of Congo. Boulenger honoured the French ichthyologist Jacques Pellegrin (1873-1944).

References

pellegrini
Fish described in 1902
Taxa named by George Albert Boulenger